Janina Stronski (born June 7, 1946), known professionally as Jenny Jones, is a Canadian-American comedian, television presenter, and chef. She is known for the tabloid talk show The Jenny Jones Show, which ran for twelve seasons from 1991 to 2003.

Life and career
Jones was born Janina Stronski in Bethlehem, then in the British Mandate of Palestine. She gave her place of birth on her appearance on "Match Game" in 1981. She moved with her family to Italy, and from there they moved to Canada in 1948. Her parents were Polish immigrants, Zosia "Sophie", a seamstress and dressmaker, and John Stroński, a Polish army officer who was with the British Armed Forces at the time of Jones' birth. Jones grew up in London, Ontario, in a strict Catholic household. Her parents ran a bridal shop in Canada.

Jones started her career as a drummer in a rock band, and later attempted a career in stand-up comedy during the 1980s. She experienced some success with comedy, winning the 1986 season of the TV talent show Star Search. Prior to that, her first television appearances were as a contestant on The Price Is Right in 1979 (winning $12,955 in cash & prizes, including a sports car and $6,000 cash), Match Game in 1981 (as Jenny Wilburn, winning $5,500), and Press Your Luck in 1985 (winning $18,706 over 3 days).

The Jenny Jones Show
The Jenny Jones Show was an American syndicated daytime tabloid talk show that was hosted by Jones. It was produced by Telepictures and was distributed by Warner Bros. Television. The show ran from September 1991 to September 2003 and was taped in Chicago at WMAQ-TV studios.

Controversy

On an episode called "Revealing Same Sex Secret Crush" taped on March 6, 1995, a gay man named Scott Amedure confessed his love for an acquaintance, Jonathan Schmitz. While on the show, Schmitz reacted with laughter; three days after the show's taping, he killed Amedure. He was later convicted of second degree murder and received a sentence of 25–50 years in prison.

Amedure's family then sued the producers of The Jenny Jones Show, saying they should have known about Schmitz's history of mental illness. In interviews, Jones said the producers told Schmitz that his admirer could be a man, but Schmitz thought that the admirer was a woman.  Jones also said that the show didn't want Schmitz to know the outcome of his secret crush. Amedure's family won the initial ruling, and the show was ordered to pay them $25 million. The verdict was later overturned by the Michigan appellate court.

Women's health advocate
Jones was an honorary chairperson for the Susan G. Komen for the Cure Chicago Race for the Cure, an annual event that raises awareness and money for breast cancer research. Jones also donated a mobile mammography motor coach to John H. Stroger Jr. Hospital of Cook County. Six silicone-implant operations since 1981 had left her with firm and asymmetrical breasts.  Jones later had her breast implants removed, and publicly spoke out against them in a cover story article in People Magazine. Jones then went on to establish The Image Foundation as a resource for women seeking information about implants and support with body image issues.

In 1997, Jones' autobiography Jenny Jones: My Story was published with 100% of her proceeds going to breast cancer research. In 2006, her cookbook Look Good, Feel Great was published and Jones again donated her profits to breast cancer research at City of Hope.

Philanthropy
Jones established The Jenny Jones Foundation in 2005 as a means to provide assistance to those in need. Primary areas of focus are education, women's health, and improving communities throughout the country. In 2008, Jenny established "Jenny's Heroes," a program where, through The Jenny Jones Foundation, she is giving two million dollars of her own money to individuals wanting to make a difference in their local communities.

Personal life
Jones maintains an official website, JennyJones.com; a cooking website, JennyCanCook.com; and a YouTube cooking channel. Another website, JennysHeroes.com, which she launched in 2008, features stories from anonymous people who positively impacted their communities. Jones has given over $1,000,000 to fifty such people who are looked upon as "heroes" since the website was launched. The website is based upon a segment of the Jenny Jones talk show which also featured such people.

Jones has been married three times. She married Al Gambino, a musician, in 1970; they divorced in 1972. Jones married Buz Wilburn (a record marketing executive) in 1973; they divorced in 1980. An earlier marriage was annulled. She is in a long-term relationship with Denis McCallion, who works as a film-location manager.

References

External links
 Jenny Jones Website
 Jenny Jones Cooking Website
 Jenny Jones YouTube Cooking Channel
 Jenny Jones Foundation Website
 Jenny Jones' Facebook page

1946 births
Canadian emigrants to the United States
American television talk show hosts
Canadian television talk show hosts
Contestants on American game shows
Living people
Comedians from Ontario
Canadian women comedians
British emigrants to Canada
Canadian people of Polish descent
People from Bethlehem
People from London, Ontario
American YouTubers
Food and cooking YouTubers